A phase change material (PCM) is a substance which releases/absorbs sufficient energy at phase transition to provide useful heat or cooling.  Generally the transition will be from one of the first two fundamental states of matter - solid and liquid - to the other.  The phase transition may also be between non-classical states of matter, such as the conformity of crystals, where the material goes from conforming to one crystalline structure to conforming to another, which may be a higher or lower energy state.

The energy released/absorbed by phase transition from solid to liquid, or vice versa, the heat of fusion is generally much higher than the sensible heat.  Ice, for example, requires 333.55 J/g to melt, but then water will rise one degree further with the addition of just 4.18 J/g.  Water/ice is therefore a very useful phase change material and has been used to store winter cold to cool buildings in summer since at least the time of the Achaemenid Empire.

By melting and solidifying at the phase change temperature (PCT), a PCM is capable of storing and releasing large amounts of energy compared to sensible heat storage.  Heat is absorbed or released when the material changes from solid to liquid and vice versa or when the internal structure of the material changes; PCMs are accordingly referred to as latent heat storage (LHS) materials.

There are two principal classes of phase change material: organic (carbon-containing) materials derived either from petroleum, from plants or from animals; and salt hydrates, which generally either use natural salts from the sea or from mineral deposits or are by-products of other processes. A third class is solid to solid phase change.

PCMs are used in many different commercial applications where energy storage and/or stable temperatures are required, including, among others, heating pads, cooling for telephone switching boxes, and clothing.

By far the biggest potential market is for building heating and cooling.  In this application area, PCMs hold potential in light of the progressive reduction in the cost of renewable electricity, coupled with the intermittent nature of such electricity. This can result in a misfit between peak demand and availability of supply.  In North America, China, Japan, Australia, Southern Europe and other developed countries with hot summers, peak supply is at midday while peak demand is from around 17:00 to 20:00.  This creates opportunities for thermal storage media.

Solid-liquid phase change materials are usually encapsulated for installation in the end application, to contain in the liquid state. In some applications, especially when incorporation to textiles is required, phase change materials are micro-encapsulated. Micro-encapsulation allows the material to remain solid, in the form of small bubbles, when the PCM core has melted.

Characteristics and classification
Latent heat storage can be achieved through changes in the state of matter from liquid→solid, solid→liquid, solid→gas and liquid→gas.  However, only solid→liquid and liquid→solid phase changes are practical for PCMs. Although liquid–gas transitions have a higher heat of transformation than solid–liquid transitions, liquid→gas phase changes are impractical for thermal storage because large volumes or high pressures are required to store the materials in their gas phase.  Solid–solid phase changes are typically very slow and have a relatively low heat of transformation.

Initially, solid–liquid PCMs behave like sensible heat storage (SHS) materials; their temperature rises as they absorb heat. Unlike conventional SHS materials, however, when PCMs reach their phase change temperature (their melting point) they absorb large amounts of heat at an almost constant temperature until all the material is melted. When the ambient temperature around a liquid material falls, the PCM solidifies, releasing its stored latent heat. A large number of PCMs are available in any required temperature range from −5 up to 190 °C. Within the human comfort range between 20 and 30 °C, some PCMs are very effective, storing over 200 kJ/kg of latent heat, as against a specific heat capacity of around one kJ/(kg*°C) for masonry.  The storage density can therefore be 20 times greater than masonry per kg if an temperature swing of 10 °C is allowed. However, since the mass of the masonry is far higher than that of PCM this specific (per mass) heat capacity is somewhat offset. A masonry wall might have a mass of 200 kg/m2, so to double the heat capacity one would require additional 10 kg/m2 of PCM.

Organic PCMs
Hydrocarbons, primarily paraffins (CnH2n+2) and lipids but also sugar alcohols.

 Advantages
 Freeze without much supercooling
 Ability to melt congruently
 Self nucleating properties
 Compatibility with conventional material of construction
 No segregation
 Chemically stable
 Safe and non-reactive
 Disadvantages
 Low thermal conductivity in their solid state. High heat transfer rates are required during the freezing cycle. Nano composites were found to yield an effective thermal conductivity increase up to 216%.
 Volumetric latent heat storage capacity can be low
 Flammable. This can be partially alleviated by specialised containment.

Inorganic
Salt hydrates (MxNy·nH2O)

Advantages
 High volumetric latent heat storage capacity
 Availability and low cost
 Sharp melting point
 High thermal conductivity
 High heat of fusion
 Non-flammable
 Sustainability
 Disadvantages
 Difficult to prevent incongruent melting and phase separation upon cycling, which can cause a significant loss in latent heat enthalpy.
 Can be corrosive to many other materials, such as metals. This can be overcome by only using specific metal-PCM pairings or encapsulation in small quantities in non-reactive plastic.
 Change of volume is very high in some mixtures
 Super cooling can be a problem in solid–liquid transition, necessitating the use of nucleating agents which may become inoperative after repeated cycling

Hygroscopic materials
Many natural building materials are hygroscopic, that is they can absorb (water condenses) and release water (water evaporates). The process is thus:
Condensation (gas to liquid) ΔH<0; enthalpy decreases (exothermic process) gives off heat.
Vaporization (liquid to gas) ΔH>0; enthalpy increases (endothermic process) absorbs heat (or cools).

While this process liberates a small quantity of energy, large surfaces area allows significant (1–2 °C) heating or cooling in buildings. The corresponding materials are wool insulation and earth/clay render finishes.

Solid-solid PCMs
A specialised group of PCMs that undergo a solid/solid phase transition with the associated absorption and release of large amounts of heat. These materials change their crystalline structure from one lattice configuration to another at a fixed and well-defined temperature, and the transformation can involve latent heats comparable to the most effective solid/liquid PCMs. Such materials are useful because, unlike solid/liquid PCMs, they do not require nucleation to prevent supercooling. Additionally, because it is a solid/solid phase change, there is no visible change in the appearance of the PCM, and there are no problems associated with handling liquids, e.g. containment, potential leakage, etc. Currently the temperature range of solid-solid PCM solutions spans from -50 °C (-58 °F) up to +175 °C (347 °F).

Selection criteria
The phase change material should possess the following thermodynamic properties:
 Melting temperature in the desired operating temperature range
 High latent heat of fusion per unit volume
 High specific heat, high density, and high thermal conductivity
 Small volume changes on phase transformation and small vapor pressure at operating temperatures to reduce the containment problem
 Congruent melting

Kinetic properties
 High nucleation rate to avoid supercooling of the liquid phase
 High rate of crystal growth, so that the system can meet demands of heat recovery from the storage system

Chemical properties
 Chemical stability
 Complete reversible freeze/melt cycle
 No degradation after a large number of freeze/melt cycle
 Non-corrosiveness, non-toxic, non-flammable and non-explosive materials

Economic properties
 Low cost
 Availability

Thermophysical properties

Key thermophysical properties of phase-change materials include: Melting point (Tm), Heat of fusion (ΔHfus), Specific heat (cp) (of solid and liquid phase), Density (ρ) (of solid and liquid phase) and thermal conductivity.  Values such as volume change and volumetric heat capacity can be calculated there from.

Technology, development, and encapsulation
The most commonly used PCMs are salt hydrates, fatty acids and esters, and various paraffins (such as octadecane). Recently also ionic liquids were investigated as novel PCMs.

As most of the organic solutions are water-free, they can be exposed to air, but all salt based PCM solutions must be encapsulated to prevent water evaporation or uptake. Both types offer certain advantages and disadvantages and if they are correctly applied some of the disadvantages becomes an advantage for certain applications.

They have been used since the late 19th century as a medium for thermal storage applications. They have been used in such diverse applications as refrigerated transportation for rail and road applications and their physical properties are, therefore, well known.

Unlike the ice storage system, however, the PCM systems can be used with any conventional water chiller both for a new or alternatively retrofit application. The positive temperature phase change allows centrifugal and absorption chillers as well as the conventional reciprocating and screw chiller systems or even lower ambient conditions utilizing a cooling tower or dry cooler for charging the TES system.

The temperature range offered by the PCM technology provides a new horizon for the building services and refrigeration engineers regarding medium and high temperature energy storage applications. The scope of this thermal energy application is wide-ranging of solar heating, hot water, heating rejection (i.e., cooling tower), and dry cooler circuitry thermal energy storage applications.

Since PCMs transform between solid–liquid in thermal cycling, encapsulation naturally became the obvious storage choice.

Encapsulation of PCMs
Macro-encapsulation: Early development of macro-encapsulation with large volume containment failed due to the poor thermal conductivity of most PCMs. PCMs tend to solidify at the edges of the containers preventing effective heat transfer.
Micro-encapsulation: Micro-encapsulation on the other hand showed no such problem. It allows the PCMs to be incorporated into construction materials, such as concrete, easily and economically. Micro-encapsulated PCMs also provide a portable heat storage system. By coating a microscopic sized PCM with a protective coating, the particles can be suspended within a continuous phase such as water. This system can be considered a phase change slurry (PCS).
Molecular-encapsulation is another technology, developed by Dupont de Nemours that allows a very high concentration of PCM within a polymer compound. It allows storage capacity up to 515 kJ/m2 for a 5 mm board (103 MJ/m3). Molecular-encapsulation allows drilling and cutting through the material without any PCM leakage.

As phase change materials perform best in small containers, therefore they are usually divided in cells. The cells are shallow to reduce static head – based on the principle of shallow container geometry. The packaging material should conduct heat well; and it should be durable enough to withstand frequent changes in the storage material's volume as phase changes occur. It should also restrict the passage of water through the walls, so the materials will not dry out (or water-out, if the material is hygroscopic). Packaging must also resist leakage and corrosion. Common packaging materials showing chemical compatibility with room temperature PCMs include stainless steel, polypropylene, and polyolefin.

Nanoparticles such as carbon nanotubes, graphite, graphene, metal and metal oxide can be dispersed in PCM. It is worth noting that inclusion of nanoparticles will not only alter thermal conductivity characteristic of PCM but also other characteristics as well, including latent heat capacity, sub-cooling, phase change temperature and its duration, density and viscosity. The new group of PCMs called NePCM. NePCMs can be added to metal foams to build even higher thermal conductive combination.

Thermal composites
Thermal composites is a term given to combinations of phase change materials (PCMs) and other (usually solid) structures. A simple example is a copper mesh immersed in paraffin wax. The copper mesh within paraffin wax can be considered a composite material, dubbed a thermal composite. Such hybrid materials are created to achieve specific overall or bulk properties (an example being the encapsulation of paraffin into distinct silicon dioxide nanospheres for increased surface area-to-volume ratio and, thus, higher heat transfer speeds ).

Thermal conductivity is a common property targeted for maximization by creating thermal composites. In this case, the basic idea is to increase thermal conductivity by adding a highly conducting solid (such as the copper mesh or graphite) into the relatively low-conducting PCM, thus increasing overall or bulk (thermal) conductivity. If the PCM is required to flow, the solid must be porous, such as a mesh.

Solid composites such as fiberglass or kevlar prepreg for the aerospace industry usually refer to a fiber (the kevlar or the glass) and a matrix (the glue, which solidifies to hold fibers and provide compressive strength). A thermal composite is not so clearly defined but could similarly refer to a matrix (solid) and the PCM, which is of course usually liquid and/or solid depending on conditions. They are also meant to discover minor elements in the earth.

Applications
Applications of phase change materials include, but are not limited to:

 Thermal energy storage, such as the FlexTherm Eco by Flamco.
 Solar cooking
 Cold Energy Battery
 Conditioning of buildings, such as 'ice-storage'
 Cooling of heat and electrical engines
 Cooling: food, beverages, coffee, wine, milk products, green houses
Delaying ice and frost formation on surfaces
 Medical applications: transportation of blood, operating tables, hot-cold therapies, treatment of birth asphyxia
 Human body cooling under bulky clothing or costumes.
 Waste heat recovery
 Off-peak power utilization: Heating hot water and Cooling
 Heat pump systems
 Passive storage in bioclimatic building/architecture (HDPE, paraffin)
 Smoothing exothermic temperature peaks in chemical reactions
 Solar power plants
 Spacecraft thermal systems
 Thermal comfort in vehicles
 Thermal protection of electronic devices
 Thermal protection of food: transport, hotel trade, ice-cream, etc.
 Textiles used in clothing
 Computer cooling
 Turbine Inlet Chilling with thermal energy storage
 Telecom shelters in tropical regions. They protect the high-value equipment in the shelter by keeping the indoor air temperature below the maximum permissible by absorbing heat generated by power-hungry equipment such as a Base Station Subsystem. In case of a power failure to conventional cooling systems, PCMs minimize use of diesel generators, and this can translate into enormous savings across thousands of telecom sites in tropics.

Fire and safety issues
Some phase change materials are suspended in water, and are relatively nontoxic. Others are hydrocarbons or other flammable materials, or are toxic. As such, PCMs must be selected and applied very carefully, in accordance with fire and building codes and sound engineering practices. Because of the increased fire risk, flamespread, smoke, potential for explosion when held in containers, and liability, it may be wise not to use flammable PCMs within residential or other regularly occupied buildings. Phase change materials are also being used in thermal regulation of electronics.

See also
 Heat pipe

References

Sources
 Phase Change Material (PCM) Based Energy Storage Materials and Global Application Examples, Zafer URE M.Sc., C.Eng. MASHRAE HVAC Applications
 Phase Change Material Based Passive Cooling Systems Design Principal and Global Application Examples, Zafer URE M.Sc., C.Eng. MASHRAE Passive Cooling Application

Further reading
 
 Phase Change Matters (industry blog)

Building engineering
Physical chemistry
Sustainable building